The Lost Lolli is Olivia's second full-length album which is a compilation of the material featured on her four mini-albums and new material. "SpiderSpins (Lost Lolli Mix)" was used as a radio single to promote the album. The entire album was sung in English. A First Press version of the album was sold exclusively at Tower Records, in Shibuya. This album reached #111 on Oricon charts.

Track listing
 "Alone in Our Castle"
 "Fake Flowers"
 "Blind Unicorn"
 "Devil's in Me"
 "Celestial Delinquent"
 "Space Halo"
 "SpiderSpins" (Lost Lolli Mix)
 "026unconscious333"
 "Under Your Waves"
 "Dreamcamp"
 "Denial"
 "Sea Me" (English Version)
 "Into the Stars" (Live Arrangement Version)

2004 albums
Olivia Lufkin albums
Avex Group albums